The Dumping Ground is a British children's drama series that focuses on the lives and experiences of young people and their care workers in care, broadcast on CBBC. The programme began on 4 January 2013, with one series airing each year since.

Series overview

Episodes

Series 1 (2013)

Series 2 (2014)

Series 3 (2015)

Series 4 (2016)

Series 5 (2017)

Series 6 (2018)

Series 7 (2019)

Series 8 (2020-21)

Series 9 (2021-22)

Series 10 (2022-23)

Specials

Jody In Wonderland (2013)

Floss The Foundling (2016)

After the end of the episode, The End Of It All in series 4, a five-minute crossover between The Dumping Ground and Hetty Feather aired on CBBC, titled A Special Dumping Ground Adventure. Its official title (according to CBBC Online) is Floss The Foundling and has instead used this title online and in subsequent TV airings.

Dumping Ground Island (2017)
After the end of series 5, an hour special aired, titled Dumping Ground Island. It is filmed in the North East of England as well as Crete, Greece. It is the first episode across the Tracy Beaker franchise that has been filmed abroad.

Sasha's Contact Meeting (2018)
After the end of the first half of series 6, a five-part mini webisode series was shown on BBC iPlayer, titled Sasha's Contact Meeting. It featured Annabelle Davis as Sasha Bellman and Endy McKay as Jenny Holmes, Sasha's new social worker.

After The DG (2018)
After The DG, a mini webisode series, is being shown on Instagram. It featured Jessica Revell and Kasey McKellar, reprising their roles as Elektra Perkins and Bailey Wharton respectively. The series was announced in 2018 and is aimed at older fans.

The Joseph & Taz Files (2018)
In August 2018, a five-part mini webisode series was shown on BBC iPlayer, titled The Joseph & Taz Files. It featured Yousef Naseer as Joseph Stubbs and Jasmine Uson as Taz De Souza.

Notes

References

Tracy Beaker series
Dumping Ground